Tom McNamara (3 June 1874 – 8 March 1936) was an Australian rules footballer who played with St Kilda in the Victorian Football League (VFL).

Notes

External links 

		

1874 births
1936 deaths
Australian rules footballers from Melbourne
St Kilda Football Club players
People from North Melbourne